Abdulkarim Abdullah Al-Kanderi (Arabic: عبدالكريم الكندري) (born 1981) is a politician, who is the current Controller of the Kuwait Parliament.

Career 
Al-Kanderi was first elected in the Kuwaiti General Election 2013, he won the tenth chair in the third constituency by 1,424 votes. However, he resigned when he found the government is not cooperative. In the Kuwaiti General Election 2016 he won the fourth chair in the same constituency by 3,325 votes. He resigned in the Kuwaiti General Election 2020 he won the 1st chair by 5,585 votes.

Al-Kanderi contributed in the following parliamentary committees:
 National Human Resources' Development Committee
 Woman and Family Committee
 Human Rights Committee
 Committee of the Draft Answer to the Emiri Speech
 Legislative and Legal Affairs Committee
 Education, Culture and Guidance Committee

References 

1981 births
Living people
Members of the National Assembly (Kuwait)
Kuwait University alumni
University of Strasbourg alumni